Woodstock North High School is a public high school located in Woodstock, Illinois, United States. It is a part of Woodstock Community Unit School District 200. Opened in 2008, it is located forty minutes south of Wisconsin and one hour northwest of Chicago. It has an enrollment of 950 students.

Athletics

IHSA post-season 

 Dance State Qualifier 2012-2013, 2020-2021, 2021-2022
 Bass Fishing Sectional Champions 2017
 Volleyball Regional Champions 2018
 Boys Basketball Regional Champions 2018-2019
 Boys Track Sectional Champions 2019
 Bass Fishing Sectional Champions 2019
 Girls Softball Regional Champions 2021-2022

See also
Woodstock High School (Illinois)
Woodstock, Illinois
McHenry County, Illinois
Marian Central Catholic High School
Schools in Illinois

References

External links
Woodstock North High School website
Community Unit School District 200 website

Public high schools in Illinois
Woodstock, Illinois
Schools in McHenry County, Illinois